Nicola Ripamonti (born 11 January 1990) is an Italian canoeist. He competed in the Men's K-2 1000 metres event at the 2016 Summer Olympics.

References

External links
 

1990 births
Living people
Italian male canoeists
Olympic canoeists of Italy
Canoeists at the 2016 Summer Olympics
Place of birth missing (living people)
Mediterranean Games gold medalists for Italy
Mediterranean Games medalists in canoeing
Competitors at the 2013 Mediterranean Games
Competitors at the 2018 Mediterranean Games
European Games competitors for Italy
Canoeists at the 2015 European Games
Canoeists at the 2019 European Games